Konarevo is a village situated in Kraljevo municipality in Serbia.

References

Konarevo

Populated places in Raška District

Famous people:Marko Mirić (Tref)(singer)